Manipuri culture may refer to:
 Meitei culture, the culture of Meitei people, the predominant ethnic group of Manipur
 Overall multiethnic culture of Manipur